Olmedo is a municipality in the province of Valladolid, Spain. The Mudéjar theme park is located here.

History

Museums
 Palacio Caballero de Olmedo.
 Parque temático del Mudéjar de Castilla y León.

Transport
Olmedo is on the N-601 road (Adanero-Olmedo-Valladolid–Medina de Rioseco–León).

The Madrid–Valladolid high-speed rail line runs through the municipality, and Olmedo is planned to be the branching point for the high-speed line running to Zamora and Galicia.

Olmedo is at one end of a 14.4km test track for high speed trains, and the Talgo gauge changer system.  Medina del Campo is at the other end.

Gastronomy 
Cuisine of the province of Valladolid

Notable people
Juan de Sarmiento, member of the Council of the Orders and historian of the Order of Alcántara;
Ignacio Ortega y Cortés, member of the Council of the Orders and assistant to Diego de Covarrubias.
Sebastián Cortés y Cárcel, jurist;
Brother Bartolomé Ochaita, advisor to Hernán Cortés;
Alonso de Zuazo (1466–1539), judge and governor of New Spain;
Juan Jiménez de Montalvo (1551–?), judge of the Royal Audiencia of Lima (1598–?) and acting Viceroy of Peru (1621–22);
Jerónimo de Alderete (1516–56), conqueror of Chile;
Julio Valdeón Baruque (1936–2009), historian;
José Antonio González Caviedes (1938–1996), mayor of Olmedo and Senator for the UPD and later for the Popular Party
Miriam González Durántez (1968–), lawyer, wife of Nick Clegg (Deputy Prime Minister of the United Kingdom 2010–15), daughter of José Antonio González Caviedes.

References

External links

Official site

Municipalities in the Province of Valladolid